The Suzuki LT125 Quadrunner (also known as the Suzuki QuadRunner 125) was an all-terrain vehicle produced by Suzuki and developed in Whanganui, New Zealand by Rod Coleman. When it was introduced alongside the ALT125 ATC in 1982, it was the first four-wheeled ATV on the market. The power was transmitted to the wheels via a 5-speed semi-automatic transmission with reverse.
Braking was accomplished via a single drum brake on the rear axle, with no front brakes. The LT125 also had no suspension front or rear, with all bump handling being accomplished by its low pressure tires.

References

Suzuki ATVs